Paul Julius Arndt (14 October 1865 – 17 July 1937) was a German classical archaeologist born in Dresden.

He studied classical art under Johannes Overbeck (1826-1895) at the University of Leipzig, and classical archeology with Heinrich Brunn (1822-1894) at the University of Munich. In 1887 he graduated with a dissertation on Greek vases, afterwards working as an assistant to Heinrich Brunn in Munich. Following Brunn's death in 1894, Arndt became an assistant to Adolf Furtwängler (1853-1907), and was responsible for edition of "Denkmäler griechischer und römischer Skulptur".

Arndt was the son of a wealthy merchant in Mecklenburg, and for much of his career was financially independent, therefore having the means to work as a private scholar and dealer of Greek art. He was primarily known as a collector of ancient sculptures, a large part of which are now kept in the Glyptothek of Munich, as well as in Ny Carlsberg Glyptotek, Copenhagen. He also amassed a superb collection of ancient gems that since 1958 have been part of the Staatlich Münzsammlung in Munich. 

Arndt's scientific estate is owned by the Institute of Classical Archaeology of the University of Erlangen.

References 
 "Parts of this article are based on a translation of an equivalent article at the German Wikipedia".
 Dictionary of Art Historians (biography)

External links
 

Archaeologists from Dresden
German art collectors
19th-century art collectors
20th-century art collectors
German art dealers
1865 births
1937 deaths